The Hardware Mutual Insurance Companies Building is located in Stevens Point, Wisconsin. It was added to the National Register of Historic Places in 1994.  The building still houses the insurance company, now known as Sentry Insurance.

References

Buildings and structures in Portage County, Wisconsin
Commercial buildings on the National Register of Historic Places in Wisconsin
Neoclassical architecture in Wisconsin
Office buildings completed in 1922
National Register of Historic Places in Portage County, Wisconsin